Bambari Airport  is an airport serving Bambari, a city in the Ouaka prefecture of the Central African Republic.

The Bambari non-directional beacon (Ident: BM) is located on the field.

See also

Transport in the Central African Republic
List of airports in the Central African Republic

References

External links 
OpenStreetMap - Bambari Airport
SkyVector - Bambari Airport
OurAirports - Bambari Airport

Airports in the Central African Republic
Buildings and structures in Ouaka